M.L.J. Magazines, Inc., see Archie Comics
MLJ, IATA code for Baldwin County Airport
The Modern Language Journal